The Celtic Chrono was an elite women's professional time trial held in Belfast and was rated by the UCI as a 1.2 race.

Past winners

References 

Cycle races in the United Kingdom
Women's road bicycle races
Sport in Belfast
2012 in road cycling
June 2012 sports events in the United Kingdom